John MacBeath, a Scottish preacher, was minister of Cambuslang Baptist Church from 1909 to 1921 or 1922. He was later minister of Haven Green Baptist Church, Ealing, from 1942 to 1949. His first wife Margaret died during this pastorate, on 16 November 1947. He then remarried to Eleanor Millard. He himself died 3 May 1967 aged 87 years. His funeral took place from Haven Green Baptist Church, of which he was Pastor Emeritus. His younger brother, Andrew MacBeath, formerly Principal of the Bible Training Institute, Glasgow, took part.

Published works
 "Afterward!" A study of the word in the Epistle to the people
 The Carpenter of Nazareth. Talks about His tools, etc
 The Circle of Time
 The Conquest of Kingdoms. The Story of the B.M.S. (Baptist Missionary Society)
 The Face of Christ
 The Fragrant Life. Mrs. John MacBeath. Gleanings from her diaries and notes of addresses given by her at meetings in Scotland and England, compiled by her husband, Rev. John MacBeath
 The Gift of Wings
 The Hills of God
 In Time of Trouble. The counsel of the Big Fisherman. [On the first Epistle of St. Peter.]
 Lamps and Lamplighters
 The Life of a Christian. [Addresses on the Epistle to the Ephesians.]
 Lilies among the Wheat. Talks to young people
 Loyalty to Jesus Christ. The test and triumph of religion. The presidential address at the Annual Assembly, Glasgow, of the Baptist Union of Scotland ... 1934
 A Number of Things. Talks to young people
 People without a Name, and other studies in simple Christian discipleship
 Poppies. [On the wearing of the poppy in memory of those who died in the Great War.]
 Roadmakers and Roadmenders
 The Round of the Year. Portraits of the months
 The Second Watch
 The Silence
 The Silent Bells
 Taken Unawares
 Thirty Pieces of Silver. A price with a history
 To the Bereaved in War
Source: COPAC 
 A Wayfarer's Psalter 1944 Marshall, Morgan & Scott

External links
 Cambuslang Baptist Church centenary history page
 Haven Green Baptist Church, Ealing (no historical/biographical info shown at this site)

Year of birth missing
1967 deaths
Scottish Baptist ministers